Rijswijk is a village in the Dutch province of Gelderland. It is a part of the municipality of Buren, and lies about 9 km north of Tiel.

It was first mentioned between 918 and 948 as Risuuic, and means "neighbourhood near twigs". The village developed along the Nederrijn as a stretched out settlement. The church tower dates from around 1500 and has a 14th century base. The church dates from the 16th century. In 1840, it was home to 536 people.

The grist mill De Hoop dates from 1703. It was restored in 1966 and 2002–2003.

Gallery

References

Populated places in Gelderland
Buren